Duane Lyman Berentson (November 22, 1928 – July 5, 2013) was an American educator and politician.

Born in Anacortes, Washington, Berentson went to the University of Washington and then Pacific Lutheran University. He taught high school and was a coach and then was a securities broker. He served in the Washington House of Representatives 1962–1980, as a Republican, and then served as secretary of the Washington Department of Transportation 1981–1993. He died in Mount Vernon, Washington.

Notes

1928 births
2013 deaths
State cabinet secretaries of Washington (state)
People from Anacortes, Washington
University of Washington alumni
Pacific Lutheran University alumni
Businesspeople from Washington (state)
Republican Party members of the Washington House of Representatives
20th-century American businesspeople